Statistics of Allsvenskan in season 1969.

Overview
The league was contested by 12 teams, with IFK Göteborg winning the championship.

League table

Results

Season statistics

Top scorers

Footnotes

References 

Allsvenskan seasons
1
Sweden
Sweden